Mewar or Mewad is a region in the south-central part of Rajasthan state of India. It includes the present-day districts of Bhilwara, Chittorgarh, Pratapgarh, Rajsamand, Udaipur, Pirawa Tehsil of Jhalawar District of Rajasthan, Neemuch and Mandsaur of Madhya Pradesh and some parts of Gujarat.

For centuries, the region was ruled by Rajputs. The princely state of Udaipur emerged as an administrative unit during the period of British East India Company governance in India and remained until the end of the British Raj era.

The Mewar region lies between the Aravali Range to the northwest, Ajmer to the north, Gujarat and the Vagad region of Rajasthan to the south, the Malwa region of Madhya Pradesh state to the south and the Hadoti region of Rajasthan to the east.

Etymology
The word "Mewar" is vernacular form of "Medapata" (IAST: Medapāṭa), the ancient name of the region. The earliest epigraph that mentions the word "Medapata" is a 996–997 CE (1053 VS) inscription discovered at Hathundi (Bijapur). The word "pata" or "pataka" refers to an administrative unit. According to the historian G. C. Raychaudhuri, Medapata was named after the Meda tribe, which has been mentioned in Varāhamihira's Brihat-Samhita. The 1460 Kumbhalgarh inscription associates the Medas with Vardhana-giri (modern Badnor in Mewar region). Historian Sashi Bhusan Chaudhuri associates the ancient Medas with the modern Mer people.

The 1285 CE (1342 VS) Mount Abu (Achaleshwar) inscription of the Guhila king Samarasimha provides the following etymology while describing the military conquests of his ancestor Bappa Rawal (Bappaka): "This country which was, in battle, totally submerged in the dripping fat (medas in Sanskrit) of wicked people by Bappaka bears the name of Śrī Medapāṭa." Historian Anil Chandra Banerjee dismisses this as a "poetic fancy", but acknowledges the 'terrible' battles fought between the Rajputs and the Arabs.

Geography
The northern and eastern portions of Mewar are made up of an elevated plateau while the western and southern portions were rocky and hilly with dense forests. The watershed divide between drainage of the Bay of Bengal and drainage of the Gulf of Khambhat runs almost through the centre of Mewar. The northern and eastern part of Mewar is a gently sloping plain, drained by the Bedach and Banas River and its tributaries, which empty northwest into the Chambal River, a tributary of the Yamuna River. The southern and western part of the region is hilly, and marks the divide between the Banas and its tributaries and the headwaters of the Sabarmati and Mahi rivers and their tributaries, which drain south into the Gulf of Khambhat through Gujarat state. The Aravalli Range, which forms the northwestern boundary of the region, is composed mostly of sedimentary rocks, like marble and Kota Stone, which has traditionally been an important construction material.

The region is part of the Khathiar-Gir dry deciduous forests' ecoregion. Protected areas include the Jaisamand Wildlife Sanctuary, the Kumbhalgarh Wildlife Sanctuary, the Bassi Wildlife Sanctuary, the Gandhi Sagar Sanctuary and the Sita Mata Wildlife Sanctuary.

Mewar has a tropical climate. Rainfall averages 660 mm/year, and is generally higher in the southwest and lower in the northeast of the region. Over 90% of the rain typically falls in the period of June to September every year, during the southwest monsoon.

See also
Baansi
Gogunda
Ajmer-Merwara

References

External links

Further reading
 Mewar through the ages, by D. L. Paliwal. Sahitya Sansthan, Rajasthan Vidyapeeth, 1970
 The Kingdom of Mewar: great struggles and glory of the world's oldest ruling dynasty, by Irmgard Meininger. D.K. Printworld, 2000. .
 Costumes of the rulers of Mewar: with patterns and construction techniques, by Pushpa Rani Mathur. Abhinav Publications, 1994. .

 
Regions of Rajasthan
Historical Indian regions